The Hampstead Farm Archeological District is the site of a significant collection of Native American prehistoric and historic settlement remains in rural Orange County, Virginia. A survey of the farm's  in 1983 identified 49 different sites of archaeological interest. Sites were found near the adjoining Rapidan River, as well as in upland areas of the farm. Along with sites found at the nearby Montpelier estate, the upland sites demonstrate the significance of that area in Native American occupation patterns. The farm is also the location of minor military fortifications from the American Civil War.

The Hampstead Farm site was listed as an archeological historic district on the National Register of Historic Places in 1984;  the farm was also included as a contributing element to the Madison-Barbour Rural Historic District in 1991, although this was principally for its architectural and scenic merit.

See also
National Register of Historic Places listings in Orange County, Virginia

References

National Register of Historic Places in Orange County, Virginia
Historic districts on the National Register of Historic Places in Virginia
Archaeological sites on the National Register of Historic Places in Virginia
Individually listed contributing properties to historic districts on the National Register in Virginia